The 2008–09 Buffalo Bulls men's basketball team represents the University at Buffalo in the 2008-09 college basketball season.  This is head coach Reggie Witherspoon's tenth season at Buffalo.

Roster

Schedule and results

|-
!colspan=9 style=| Regular season

|-
!colspan=9 style=| MAC tournament

|-
!colspan=9 style=| College Basketball Invitational

Buffalo
Buffalo Bulls men's basketball seasons
Buffalo
Buffalo Bulls
Buffalo Bulls